The 2019 Big East women's basketball tournament concluded the 2018–19 season of Big East Conference women's basketball. The event was held March 9–12, 2019, at Wintrust Arena in Chicago. DePaul won the championship game over Marquette , 74–73.

Seeds
Marquette, DePaul and Butler have clinched first round byes. Xavier will play in the first round

Schedule

Source:

Bracket

* denotes overtime period

See also

 2019 Big East men's basketball tournament

References

External links
Big East website

Big East women's basketball tournament
Basketball competitions in Chicago
Big East tournament
Big East tournament
College basketball tournaments in Illinois
Women's sports in Illinois